National Highway 233 is a National Highway in India that links Varanasi, Uttar Pradesh to Lumbini, Nepal  via Azamgarh. Work on four lanning is in progress.

Route description 
National Highway 233 starts at the Varanasi and runs to Tanda and Lumbini

 Varanasi
 Chandwak
 Lalganj
 Rani Ki Sarai
 Azamgarh
 Gomadih
 Burhanpur
 Atrauliya
 Baskhari
 Tanda
 Basti
Rudhauli
Bansi
Siddharthnagar
Birdpur
Kakrahwan
 Lumbini

See also
 List of National Highways in India (by Highway Number)
 National Highways Development Project

References 

National Highways in Uttar Pradesh